Netrin-G2 is a protein that in humans is encoded by the NTNG2 gene.

References

Further reading

Netrins